Ashperton railway station was a railway station serving the village of Ashperton in Herefordshire, England. It was located on what is now known as the Cotswold Line.

History

Opened by the Worcester and Hereford Railway, it became part of the West Midland Railway then was absorbed by the Great Western Railway.  The station then passed on to the Western Region of British Railways
on nationalisation in 1948. It was then closed by the British Railways Board.

The site today

Trains on the Cotswold Line pass the site.  Geograph

References

Further reading

Disused railway stations in Herefordshire
Former Great Western Railway stations
Railway stations in Great Britain opened in 1861
Railway stations in Great Britain closed in 1965
Beeching closures in England
1861 establishments in England